is a core bus-operating company of the Keio Group which was established on February 1, 2002, inherited business all of the Keio Electric Railway (present Keio Corporation) automobile operation division and started business on August 1 of the same year. The head office of these companies is located in Fuchu, Tokyo, Japan. The operating area of a general bus on a regular route is mainly the Tokyo Tama area and if the management commission route to each subsidiary company is included, the operating area is reached mostly whole region along all areas along the Keio railroad lines. Moreover, it operates around the expressway bus routes to Nagano Prefecture, Hida-Takayama, Miyagi Prefecture, etc. from Shinjuku.

History 
The history of the bus of Keio starts for the Keio Denki Kidō Co. to have opened the bus on April 15, 1913 in the section where the railroad is not opened for traffic (between Shinjuku Station - Sasazuka Station and between Chōfu Station - Fuchū Station - Kokubunji Station). Although these were the first bus business in Tokyo, the tone of the provisional means of transport was deep, and canceled between Chōfu Station - Kokubunji Station in 1914, between Shinjuku Station - Sasazuka Station was abolished with railroad commencement of business in 1915, and all have taken down the curtain for a short period of time.

Keio sets about a bus enterprise in early stages of Shōwa period again. Banzai Jidōsha Co.() which operated around the bus from the end of Taishō period changed the company name to the Kōshū Kaidō Noriai Jidōsha Co.() in July, 1924, and the route was extended  to Tama-mura Tokyo city-owned park cemetery (present Tama Cemetery) through Karasuyama and Chofu. However, Keio which has a railroad in parallel to the Kōshū Kaidō felt this as the threat, and made more than the majority of the holdings of the company acquisition and an associated company in May, 1927. Furthermore, the Keio acquired Kōshū Kaidō Noriai Jidōsha in 1937, and absorbed enterprise all. Thereby, the automobile division and Sasazuka office were installed and the bus enterprise of the direct management which leads to the present Keio Dentetsu Bus Group was resumed. Hachiōji Shigai Jidōsha Co.() was purchased and the Hachioji Office was established in 1938. Moreover, Takahata Noriai is purchased in the same year, Yugi Noriai Jidōsha was purchased in 1939, and these enterprises were absorbed. The Pacific War broke out and the route within Yamanote Line was transferred to Tokyo City on February 1, 1942 for the war integration based on a land transport business method of preparation. Moreover, the Keio came to be merged by Tokyu Corporation on May 31, 1944 (Keio Teito Electric Railway dissociated from Tokyu in 1948).

Depots 
Head Office of Keio Dentetsu Bus and its subsidiaries - 2-22, Harumichō, Fuchu, Tokyo, Japan
Keio Dentetsu Bus
Hachioji Depot - 1304-3, Naganumamachi, Hachioji, Tokyo, Japan
Sakuragaoka Depot - 4-898, Ochikawa, Hino, Tokyo, Japan.
Keio Bus Higashi
Nakano Depot - 51-9, Yayoichō 2-chōme, Nakano, Tokyo, Japan
Eifukucho Depot - 60-19, Eifuku 2-chōme, Suginami, Tokyo, Japan
Chofu Depot - 6-6, Kokuryōchō, Chofu, Tokyo, Japan
Setagaya Depot - 9-1, Kami-Kitazawa, 5-chōme, Setagaya, Tokyo, Japan
Keio Bus Chuo
Fuchu Depot -  22, Harumichō 2-chōme, Fuchu, Tokyo, Japan
Keio Bus Minami
Minami-Osawa Depot - 26-1, Minami-Ōsawa 5-chōme, Hachioji, Tokyo, Japan
Tama Depot - 1-1, Minamino 1-chōme, Tama, Tokyo, Japan
Terada Branch Office - 374-1, Teradamachi, Hachiōji, Tokyo, Japan
Keio Bus Koganei
Koganei Depot - 3-31, Honchō 5-chōme, Koganei, Tokyo, Japan

Major routes

Expressway bus routes

Regular routes 

Operators:
 D : Keio Dentetsu Bus
 H : Keio Bus Higashi
 C : Keio Bus Chuo
 M : Keio Bus Minami
 K : Keio Bus Koganei
From Shibuya Station
for Hatsudai Station via Tomigaya and Tokyo Opera City H
for Sasazuka Station via Tomigaya H
for Asagaya Station via Hōnanchō and Shin-Kōenji Station H
From Shinjuku Station 
for Nakano Station via Rokugō-Dōri H
for Eifukuchō via Hōnanchō H
From Nakano Station
for Eifukuchō via Hōnanchō H
Daitabashi Circulate Line H
From Kōenji Station
for Eifukuchō via Shin-Kōenji Station H
From Chōfu Station North Exit
for Kichijōji Station via Chūō Expressway Jindaiji B.S. H
for Kyorin University Hospital via Chūō Expressway Jindaiji B.S. H
From Chōfu station South Exit
for Tsutsujigaoka Station via Matsubara H
for Kurumagaeshi-Danchi-Orikaeshijō via Tamagawa-Dōri H
for Inagi Municipal Hospital via Yanokuchi Station H
From Fuchū Station
for Musashi-Koganei Station via Ippongi and Gakuen-Dōri Post Office D
for Kokubunji Station via Meisei Gakuen D
for Kunitachi Station via Fuchu Hospital C
for Inagi Municipal Hospital via Koremasa C
From Seiseki-Sakuragaoka Station
for Tama-Center Station via Matsugaya D
for Minami-Ōsawa Station via Yugi-Orikaeshijō M
for Takahatafudō Station via Mogusaen Station D
From Takahatafudō Station
for Tachikawa Station via Hino Bridge D
for Teikyo University D
From Hino Station
for Toyoda Station via Izumizuka D
for Hachiōji Station via Hinodai D
From Toyoda Station
for Hachiōji Station via Ōwada-Sakaue D
for Tama-Center Station via Tama Tech D
From Hachiōji Station (Keio & JR) North Exit
for Nagafusa-Danchi and Shiroyamate via Oiwake D
for Tategaoka-Danchi via Nishi-Hachiōji Station D
From Hachiōji Station (JR) South Exit
for Mejirodai Station via Fujimori Park D 
for Minami-Ōsawa Station via Kitano Station M
From Minami-Ōsawa Station
Minami-Ōsawa 5-chome junkan (Circulate Line) M
for Tama Art University M
From Takao Station
for Tategaoka-Danchi D
for Kobotoke M

Community Bus routes 
  in Shibuya in collaboration with Tokyu Transsés and Fuji Express.
  in Shinjuku.
  in Suginami City in collaboration with Kanto Bus.
  in Chōfu, Tokyo in collaboration with Odakyu Bus.
  in Kokubunji City in collaboration with Tachikawa Bus.
  in Koganei City.
  in Fuchu City.
  in Hino City.
  in Tama City.

Cars 

The vehicles introduced from four manufacturers, Hino, Isuzu, Mitsubishi Fuso and Nissan Diesel, are held into the Keio Dentetsu Bus Group. Although the general route vehicle is introduced from all these four manufacturers, the rate of the Nissan Diesel vehicles is slightly high. The reason is that the one-step vehicles with narrow width and long body (Nissan Diesel JP) were purchased in lump sum from Nissan Diesel in advancing low floor-ization of vehicles in the mid-1990s.

See also 
List of bus operating companies in Japan (east)
Keio Corporation
Nishi Tokyo Bus

References

External links 

 Keio Dentetsu Bus Group 
 highwaybus.com  (for expressway bus information)
 highwaybus.com  (for expressway bus information)
 Bus-Navi.com  (for timetable information)

Bus companies of Japan
Transport companies based in Tokyo
Transport companies established in 2002
Keio Corporation
Western Tokyo
Japanese companies established in 2002